The 2012 SEC softball tournament was held at Rhoads Stadium on the campus of The University of Alabama in Tuscaloosa, Alabama on May 10 through May 12, 2012. The Alabama Crimson Tide won the tournament for the 5th time in their history, and received the conference's automatic bid to the 2012 NCAA Division I softball tournament.

Seeds

The seeding for the tournament is as follows:

Tournament

 Arkansas, Ole Miss and South Carolina did not make the tournament. Vanderbilt does not sponsor a softball team.

See also
SEC softball tournament
SEC Tournament
2012 Alabama Crimson Tide softball season

External links
2012 SEC softball tournament

References

SEC softball tournament
Tournament
SEC softball tournament